The 1994 United States Senate elections were held November 8, 1994, with the 33 seats of Class 1 contested in regular elections. Special elections were also held to fill vacancies. The Republican Party took control of the Senate from the Democrats. Like for most other midterm elections, the opposition, this time being the Republicans, held the traditional advantage. The congressional Republicans campaigned against the early presidency of Bill Clinton, including his unsuccessful health care plan.
The Republicans successfully defended all of their seats and won eight from the Democrats by defeating the incumbent Senators Harris Wofford (Pennsylvania) and Jim Sasser (Tennessee), in addition to picking up six open seats in Arizona, Maine, Michigan, Ohio, Oklahoma, and Tennessee. Notably, since Sasser's defeat coincided with a Republican victory in the special election to replace Al Gore, Tennessee's Senate delegation switched from entirely Democratic to entirely Republican in a single election. That would not happen again until 2021, when the Democrats flipped Georgia's delegation in the state's regularly-scheduled and special Senate elections.

The elections marked the first time Republicans controlled the Senate since January 1987 and coincided with the first change of control in the House of Representatives since January 1955 and a Republican net gain of ten governorships. Furthermore, this was the first popular election in which Republicans won all Senate seats up in the Deep South.

Collectively, the Republican gains are known as the Republican Revolution. Minority leader Robert J. Dole became Majority Leader, and on the Democratic side, Tom Daschle became Minority Leader after the retirement of the previous Democratic leader, George J. Mitchell. It was also the first time since 1980 that Republicans made net gains in the Senate but the last time until 2018 the Republicans also made gains among Class 1 senators.

Initially, the balance was 52–48 in favor of the Republicans, but after the power change, the Democrats Richard Shelby and Ben Nighthorse Campbell switched parties and brought the balance to 54–46. The Democrat Ron Wyden won a 1996 special election to replace the Republican Bob Packwood, which left the balance at 53–47 before the next election cycle. , it is the last election cycle in which Republicans won Senate elections in Delaware, Michigan, and Washington.

Results summary 

Source: Clerk of the U.S. House of Representatives

Change in composition

Before the elections

After the elections

Beginning of the next Congress

Gains and losses

Retirements
Three Republicans and four Democrats retired instead of seeking re-election. Additionally, one Democrat also retired instead of finishing the unexpired term.

Resignations
One Democrat resigned four years into his six year term.

Defeats
Two Democrats sought re-election but lost in the general election.

Race summary

Special elections 

In these special elections, the winners were elected and seated during 1994.

Elections are sorted by date then state and class.

Elections leading to the next Congress 

In these general elections, the winners were elected for the term beginning January 3, 1995; ordered by state.

All of the elections involved the Class 1 seats.

Closest races

Arizona 

Three-term Democratic incumbent Dennis DeConcini retired after being a member of the Keating Five Scandal.  Republican Congressman Jon Kyl defeated his Democratic opponent, fellow Congressman Sam Coppersmith by a comfortable margin.

California 

Dianne Feinstein won a special election in 1992 to fill the seat of Governor Pete Wilson. She faced wealthy Republican Congressman Michael Huffington in her race for a full term. Feinstein emerged victorious by less than two points.

After one term in the House representing Santa Barbara and San Luis Obispo counties, Huffington spent $8 million by the end of August and a total of $28 million during the entire campaign. He became wealthy off oil and gas. The race saw personal attacks on Huffington's wife, Arianna Huffington, who was very involved in the race (the media dubbed her the "Sir Edmund Hillary of social climbing," according to The Almanac of American Politics).

Huffington was called a hypocrite for supporting Proposition 187 and then breaking the law for employing illegal aliens, a story which came out in the race's final days. A grand total of $44 million was spent in the election. At the time, it was the most expensive campaign in a non-presidential election in American history. Chris Cillizza of The Washington Post named the election one of the nastiest senate elections in modern history.

On election day it was a very close race, but Feinstein won Los Angeles County, which may have pulled her ahead. Her sizable win in the nine-county San Francisco Bay Area may also be credited to her slim statewide victory.

Connecticut 

Freshman Democratic incumbent Joseph Lieberman easily won re-election over Republican physician Jerry Labriola.

Delaware 

Veteran Republican incumbent William Roth, seeking his fifth term, fended off a challenge from Charles Oberly, the state's three-term Democratic attorney general, beating him by 13 points.

Florida 

Republican incumbent Connie Mack III won a second term by scoring an easy re-election over attorney Hugh Rodham, brother of First Lady Hillary Rodham Clinton.

Rodham left the public defenders office to run for the United States Senate in Florida in 1994. He won the Democratic Party nomination by defeating Mike Wiley in a runoff election, after earlier finishing first in a four-person primary field with 34 percent. After the first primary, the third-place finisher, Miami lawyer Ellis Rubin joined forces with Rodham as a "senior executive consultant" and hatchet man. In the presence of Rodham at a press conference, Rubin levelled the accusation that Wiley was hiding his Jewish faith by changing his name from his birth name, Michael Schreibman, and that Wiley "changed his name before the campaign to deceive voters about his Jewish religion." Wiley accordingly refused to endorse Rodham after the runoff. Rodham then lost by a 70%–30% margin to incumbent senator Republican Connie Mack III in the general election. Although Bill and Hillary Clinton both campaigned for him, his organization was unable to take advantage of their help, he had few funds, almost no television commercials, and little support from the Florida Democratic party establishment in a year that saw Republican gains everywhere. After the election, Rubin switched allegiance again and charged Rodham with election law violations in the first primary; the Federal Elections Commission eventually dismissed the allegations.

Hawaii 

Democratic incumbent Daniel Akaka was first appointed to this seat April 1990 after the death of senator Spark Matsunaga. He won his first full term by defeating Republican cattle rancher Mary Hustace in a landslide.

Indiana 

Three-term Republican incumbent Richard Lugar scored an overwhelming 37-point win against former Democratic Rep. Jim Jontz, who was attempting a comeback after losing re-election in 1992.

Lugar won 91 of Indiana's 92 counties, Jontz won only the Democratic stronghold of Lake County.

Maine 

One of the Republicans' biggest prizes was the seat of retiring Majority Leader George Mitchell. Longtime Congresswoman Olympia Snowe gained the seat in a landslide victory over Democratic Congressman Thomas Andrews, a stark contrast to retiring senator Mitchell's landslide win six years prior.

Maryland 

Democratic incumbent Paul Sarbanes won a third term by soundly defeating Republican Bill Brock, a former U.S. senator from Tennessee (1971–77), RNC chairman (1977-81), U.S. Trade Representative (1981–85) and U.S. Secretary of Labor (1985–87).

Massachusetts 

Ted Kennedy usually coasted to re-election, but in this election he faced an unusually tough challenge from Republican businessman Mitt Romney. Though the final result was a 17-point Kennedy victory, it marked the first time since his initial election in 1962 that Kennedy received less than 60% of the vote.

Romney defeated his closest competitor, John Lakian, to win the Republican primary with over 80% of the vote. He campaigned as a political moderate and Washington outsider, and posed the greatest challenge ever made against Kennedy for the Senate seat since he first took office in 1962. Democratic congressmen across the country were struggling to maintain their seats, and Kennedy in particular was damaged by character concerns and an ongoing divorce controversy. The contest became very close.

Kennedy launched ads criticizing Romney's tenure as the leader of the company known as Bain Capital, accusing him of treating workers unfairly and taking away jobs, while also criticizing what were widely considered to be Romney's shifting political views. Romney also performed inadequately in the debates between the two candidates, and made a number of poorly received statements that reduced his standing in the polls.

In the closest Senate election of his career since after 1962, Kennedy won by a reasonably comfortable margin, despite a series of losses for Democrats around the country.

Romney was initially behind businessman John Lakian in the battle to win the Massachusetts Republican Party's nomination for the U.S. Senate. However, after using his personal wealth to advertise heavily on television, he gained overwhelming support at the state party convention.

Romney then defeated Lakian easily in the September 1994 Republican Party primary with over 80 percent of the vote.

In the general election, Kennedy faced the first serious re-election challenger of his career in the younger, telegenic, and very well-funded Romney. Romney ran as a successful entrepreneur and Washington outsider with a strong family image and moderate stands on social issues.
After two decades out of public view, his father George re-emerged during the campaign. George Romney had urged Mitt to enter the race and moved into his son's house for its duration, serving as an unofficial advisor.

Kennedy was more vulnerable than usual in 1994, in part because of the unpopularity of the Democratic Congress as a whole and also because this was Kennedy's first election since the William Kennedy Smith trial in Florida, in which Kennedy had taken some public relations hits regarding his character. Kennedy was saddled not only with his recent past but the 25th anniversary of the Chappaquiddick incident and his first wife Joan Bennett Kennedy seeking a renegotiated divorce settlement.

Some early polls showed Romney close to Kennedy. By mid-September 1994, polls showed the race to be even. One Boston Herald/WCVB-TV poll taken after the September 20, 1994 primary showed Romney ahead 44 percent to 42 percent, within the poll's sampling margin of error. In another September poll, Romney had a 43 to 42 percent lead. President Bill Clinton traveled to Massachusetts to campaign for Kennedy.

Religion became an issue for a while, after Kennedy's campaign said it was fair to ask Romney about his LDS Church's past policy of not allowing blacks into the priesthood. Romney accused Kennedy of having violated senator John F. Kennedy's famous September 1960 pledge not to allow his own Catholic doctrine to inform policy, made during his ultimately victorious presidential campaign. George Romney forcefully interjected during his son's press conference, "I think it is absolutely wrong to keep hammering on the religious issues. And what Ted is trying to do is bring it into the picture."

After Romney touted his business credentials and his record at creating jobs within his company, Kennedy ran campaign ads showing an Indiana company, Ampad, bought out by Romney's firm, Bain Capital. They showed interviews with its union workers who had been fired and who criticized Romney for the loss of their jobs, with one saying, "I don't think Romney is creating jobs because he took every one of them away." Romney claimed that 10,000 jobs were created because of his work at Bain, but private detectives hired by Kennedy found a factory bought by Bain Capital that had suffered a 350-worker strike after Bain had cut worker pay and benefits. Kennedy's charges were effective, as more voters decided that Romney was interested in profits more than people.

Kennedy's attack ads also focused both on Romney's shifting political views; although both Kennedy and Romney supported the abortion rights established under Roe v. Wade, Kennedy accused Romney of being "multiple choice" on the issue, rather than "pro choice." Romney said his stance dated back to his mother, Lenore Romney, and her position during her 1970 U.S. Senate campaign: "My mother and my family have been committed to the belief that we can believe as we want, but we will not force our beliefs on others on that matter. And you will not see me wavering on that." Nevertheless, women's groups and Democrats viewed Romney's position with suspicion. (In subsequent years, Romney became anti-abortion and opposed Roe.)

Kennedy's campaign ran short on money, and belying his image as endlessly wealthy, he was forced to take out a second mortgage on his Virginia home.
Kennedy's new wife Vicki Reggie Kennedy proved to be a strong asset in campaigning.

By early October, Kennedy was ahead by 49 to 44 percent in a poll by The Boston Globe. In their first televised debate, held at Faneuil Hall on October 25, Kennedy came out charging with his aging but still booming voice; regarding the Ampad deal, he said to Romney, "I don't know why you wouldn't meet with the strikers with that flimflam deal of yours out there in Indiana." Romney charged that Kennedy had benefited from a real-estate deal that had been done on a no-bid basis, but Kennedy responded with a rehearsed line: "Mr. Romney, the Kennedys are not in public service to make money. We have paid too high a price in our commitment to the public service of this country." Each candidate was asked to discuss one of their own failings. In a dramatic moment, Kennedy indirectly referred to his personal problems and acknowledged that he was "painfully aware" that on such occasions he had let his supporters down. By contrast, Romney mentioned work for several local charities he was engaged with on a near daily basis. When the moderator reminded him of the question, Romney responded "I guess what I regret is that I'm not able to provide even more help for those less fortunate than myself.... I wish I could do even more." Kennedy won this key debate as he reconnected with his traditional bases of support: two polls of voters conducted afterwards both showed Kennedy as the victor in the debate. One post-debate October general election poll showed Kennedy leading 50 percent to 32, and another by 56 to 36 percent. A second debate, held two days later at Holyoke Community College, focused more on policy details and lacked the intensity of the first one; Romney failed to gain any traction from it.

In the November general election, despite a very bad result for Democrats overall, Kennedy won re-election by a 58 percent to 41 percent margin, the closest re-election race of his career; only his initial victory in the 1962 Senate special election in Massachusetts was closer.

Michigan 

Democratic senator Donald W. Riegle Jr. retired after three terms. Former Michigan Republican Party Chairman Spencer Abraham defeated Democratic Congressman Milton Robert Carr in the race to succeed Riegle.

Riegle, a three-term incumbent, was considered one of the most vulnerable Senate Democrats in the 1994 mid-term elections due to the unpopularity of President Bill Clinton and his being involved as a member of the Keating Five, a group of five senators who were accused of corruption. After months of speculation, Riegle announced he would not seek a 4th term in a speech on the Senate floor.

Minnesota 

Incumbent Republican David Durenberger decided to retire instead of seeking a third full term. Republican Rod Grams won the open seat. After surviving a messy Republican primary, former TV news anchor and one-term Rep. Rod Grams defeated his Democratic opponent, former state assembly minority leader Ann Wynia by five points for the seat being vacated by incumbent Republican Dave Durenberger.

Mississippi 

Republican incumbent Trent Lott won a second term by easily defeating former Democratic state senator Ken Harper.

Missouri 

Republican senator John Danforth retired after three terms. Former Republican Gov. John Ashcroft defeated his Democratic opponent, six-term Rep. Alan Wheat by more than twenty points.

Montana 

Democrat Jack Mudd, former dean of the University of Montana law school, defeated former U.S. senator John Melcher in the Democratic primary and then went on to lose to Republican incumbent Conrad Burns, who was seeking a second term.

Nebraska 

Democrat Bob Kerrey won re-election over Republican Jan Stoney, Vice President of Personnel at Northwestern Bell, by ten points.

Nevada 

Democratic incumbent Richard H. Bryan scored a ten-point win over Republican Hal Furman, a water policy advisor for the Interior Department.

New Jersey 

Two-term Democratic incumbent Frank Lautenberg narrowly defeated his Republican opponent, state assembly speaker Chuck Haytaian by three points.

New Mexico 

Two-term Democratic incumbent Jeff Bingaman defeated his Republican opponent, former George H. W. Bush Assistant Secretary of Defense Colin McMillan by eight points.

New York 

Veteran Democratic incumbent Daniel Patrick Moynihan easily defeated his Republican opponent, businesswoman Bernadette Castro.

1994 was significant for the Republican Revolution, mostly as a referendum against President Bill Clinton and his health care plan, and was seen as a tough year for Democratic incumbents. Moynihan, however, was New York State's most popular politician at the time, and ran ahead of all other Democrats competing statewide.

Republican Castro was running for office for the first time and had trouble raising funds due to being seen as unlikely to win; at times during the race she trailed by up to 30 percentage points. She portrayed herself as a fiscally conservative, socially moderate Republican in the mold of Governor of New Jersey Christie Todd Whitman, and attempted to portray Moynihan as excessively liberal and prone to government spending. But Moynihan repeated his past strong performance among upstate voters, in addition to the usual Democratic strongholds in New York City.

North Dakota 

Incumbent Dem-NPL-er Kent Conrad won re-election to his first full term as senior senator, although technically his second term in the position, having served the end of Quentin Burdick's term after his death. Conrad also had served an additional term as senator, but as junior senator from 1986 to 1992.

Ohio 

Senator Howard Metzenbaum retired and his son-in-law Joel Hyatt received the Democratic nomination to succeed him. Hyatt would go on to be badly defeated by Lieutenant Governor Mike DeWine.

Oklahoma (special) 

Incumbent Democrat David L. Boren decided to resign his position to accept the position as President of the University of Oklahoma, which prompted a special election. Republican Congressman Jim Inhofe defeated the Democratic Congressman Dave McCurdy.

Pennsylvania 

Democrat Harris Wofford was appointed to the Senate when three-term Republican H. John Heinz III died in a 1991 plane crash. He won a special election to hold that seat later that year. In his tough re-election against Republican Congressman Rick Santorum, the pro-choice Wofford lost the endorsement of anti-abortion Democratic Governor Robert Casey. This contributed to his loss to Santorum by two percentage points.

Wofford's campaign was hurt from the outset by his strong connection with President Bill Clinton's failed healthcare reform proposals; Wofford had made working toward universal healthcare a crucial issue in his prior campaign and was one of the executive's strongest allies on the issue. After this failure, however, the senator ran a relatively passive campaign. He instead attempted to focus attention on his challenger, an arch-conservative who did not attempt to moderate his views after the primary election. The polarizing Santorum took strong positions against abortion, gay rights, and affirmative action, and he even clashed with some of the traditional fixtures of the state's moderate Republican establishment. Early in the campaign and with little statewide name recognition, Santorum made a critical error by attacking Social Security, and Wofford appeared to be in relatively safe position. However, Santorum ran an effective grassroots campaign and specifically targeted many union Democrats who had reservations about the liberal social values advocated by many of their party's leaders.

In the closing weeks of the campaign, Santorum was greatly helped by strong Republican enthusiasm because of anger over Clinton's failed initiatives. He solidified his status by running a series of positive ads that attempted to define his character strengths and to contrast with Wofford's negative commercials. Santorum eventually received a close victory by performing well (and nearly winning) his home in the suburban Pittsburgh region and through particularly low turnout in Democratic strongholds, such as Philadelphia, Scranton, and Pittsburgh cities.

Rhode Island 

Moderate Republican incumbent John Chafee, seeking a fourth term, defeated Democratic state representative Linda Kushner by 28-points.

Tennessee 

Due to the resignation of Al Gore in 1993 to become Vice President, there were two senate elections in Tennessee as both seats were up for election.

Tennessee (regular) 

One of the biggest upsets of the night was the defeat of three-term Democrat Jim Sasser. Sasser had been the influential Chairman of the Budget Committee and was among the leading candidates to replace Mitchell as Democratic Floor Leader. Sasser, however, would be defeated by prominent Nashville heart surgeon Bill Frist by 14 points.

There were two unforeseen events that affected the campaign. One was the large scale of discontent that the American people seemed to have toward the first two years of the Clinton administration, especially the proposal for a national healthcare system largely put together and advocated by Clinton's wife, Hillary Clinton. The other was the somewhat unexpected nomination of Nashville heart transplant surgeon Bill Frist for the seat by the Republicans.

Frist, who had never voted until he was 36, was a political unknown and a total novice at campaigning, but was from one of Nashville's most prominent and wealthiest medical families, which gave him some name recognition, as well as adequate enough resources to match the campaign war chest built up by the three-term incumbent, a challenge most "insurgent" candidates find to be impossible. A further factor working to Frist's advantage was a simultaneous Republican campaign by actor and attorney Fred Thompson for the other Tennessee Senate seat, which was open due to Al Gore resigning to become Vice President of the United States. Another factor in Frist's favor was that Sasser was never seen as possessing much charisma of his own. During the campaign Nashville radio stations were derisive towards Sasser to the point of stating that he could only win "a Kermit The Frog lookalike contest." In one of the largest upsets in a night of political upsets in the November 1994 U.S. general elections, Frist defeated the incumbent Sasser by approximately 14 percentage points.

Tennessee (special) 

Less surprising was the Republican victory in the other Tennessee Senate contest. Harlan Matthews had held the seat since Al Gore's resignation to assume the Vice Presidency in 1993, but chose not to seek the Democratic nomination in the special election. The Republican actor and attorney Fred Thompson, defeated six-term Democratic Congressman Jim Cooper in an overwhelming landslide.

Texas 

Republican Kay Bailey Hutchison, having just won a special election the previous June for the seat vacated by Democrat Lloyd Bentsen, easily defeated Democrat Richard W. Fisher, an investment banker.

Utah 

Veteran Republican incumbent Orrin Hatch delivered a 40-point defeat to his Democratic opponent, attorney Patrick Shea.

Vermont 

Moderate Republican Jim Jeffords won a second term, defeating Democratic state senator Jan Backus and independent Gavin Mills. He won every county in the state.

Virginia 

Democrat Chuck Robb received over 70% of the vote when first elected in 1988, but struggled to win re-election. Furor over Robb's alleged affair with model Tai Collins provided plenty of momentum for the Republican Iran-Contra figure Oliver North. A factor to Robb's advantage was the independent candidacy of attorney J. Marshall Coleman. North likely lost votes to Coleman especially when Virginia's other senator, Republican John Warner, endorsed Coleman over North. Robb received 46% of the vote to North's 43% with Coleman garnering 11%.

Oliver North was a very controversial figure as he was involved in the Iran-Contra Affair, a scandal during Ronald Reagan's presidency. Marshall Coleman attempted to seize the middle ground between Robb and North. Republican senator John Warner of Virginia endorsed Marshall Coleman. On the eve of the election, former first lady Nancy Reagan told a reporter that North had lied to her husband when discussing Iran-Contra with the former president, effectively eviscerating him. North's candidacy was documented in the 1996 film A Perfect Candidate.

In his failed bid to unseat Robb, North raised $20.3 million in a single year through nationwide direct mail solicitations, telemarketing, fundraising events, and contributions from major donors. About $16 million of that amount was from direct mail alone. This was the biggest accumulation of direct mail funds for a statewide campaign to that date, and it made North the top direct mail political fundraiser in the country in 1994.

Douglas Wilder, the first black Governor of Virginia, who served from 1990-1994, originally entered the Senate race as an independent before dropping out.

Washington 

Republican incumbent Slade Gorton, seeking his third non-consecutive term, defeated his Democratic opponent, King County Councilman Ron Sims.

West Virginia 

Democratic incumbent Robert Byrd, first elected in 1958, easily defeated his Republican opponent State Committee Finance Chairman Stanley L. Klos.

Klos campaigned as a "sacrificial lamb" against Robert C. Byrd participating in the Republican U.S. Senatorial Committee's strategy to re-capture a majority in the United States Senate in 1994. Byrd spent $1,550,354 to Klos' $267,165. Additionally the Democratic Party invested over $1 million in that state's campaign to the Republican Party's $15,000. The GOP captured a majority in the U.S. Senate. The highlights of the campaign included the hiring of an actor to play Robert C. Byrd who toured in staged Statewide Debates when the incumbent refused Klos's invitation for a series of formal senate debates. The campaign also organized successful demonstrations against the Bill and Hillary Clinton National Health Care Bus as it traveled through West Virginia in the summer of 1994. Senator Byrd, while the bill was being debated on the Senate floor rose suggesting the brakes be put on approving National Health Care measure while the bus was completing its tour in WV. To Klos's credit, the campaign did not implement the "Death by a Thousand Cuts" plan proposed by strategists which was later acknowledged in speeches given and letters written by U.S. senator Byrd.

Wisconsin 

Democratic incumbent Herb Kohl had little trouble winning a second term over former Republican state assemblyman Robert Welch.

Wyoming 

Republican incumbent Malcolm Wallop retired after three terms. Republican Rep. Craig Thomas trounced Mike Sullivan, the state's two-term Democratic governor by twenty points.

See also 

 1994 United States elections
 1994 United States gubernatorial elections
 1994 United States House of Representatives elections
 103rd United States Congress
 104th United States Congress

Notes

References

External links 

 
 California: From the Secretary of State of California
 JoinCalifornia 1994 General Election